Protei  may refer to:
 Protei-5 Russian diver-rider
 Latin genitive or plural of "Proteus": see Proteus (disambiguation)